Guni is a rural locality (a selo) in Kazbekovsky District, Republic of Dagestan, Russia. The population was 3,101 as of 2010. There are 59 streets.

Nationalities 
Avars live there.

Geography
Guni is located 7 km southeast of Dylym (the district's administrative centre) by road. Khubar and Gertma are the nearest rural localities.

References 

Rural localities in Kazbekovsky District